Clint Moses (born April 4, 1976) is an American chiropractor, farmer, and politician.  A Republican, he represents the 29th assembly district of the Wisconsin State Assembly.  The 29th district comprises the cities of Menomonie and New Richmond, as well as several villages and towns in eastern St. Croix and western Dunn counties in western Wisconsin. He was elected to his first term in November 2020.

Early life and education
Clint Moses was born and raised in Menomonie, Wisconsin, where he worked on his family's farm.  He was a Boy Scout throughout his childhood and attained the rank of Eagle Scout.  While still in high school, he started a lawncare business to earn money for college. After graduating from Menomonie High School, he was able to fund his education at University of Wisconsin–Stout, where he double-majored in human biology and psychology.  He went on from there to earn his doctorate in chiropractic from Northwestern College of Chiropractic.  In 2003, he opened Red Cedar Chiropractic with his wife, Nora.

Moses has been heavily involved as a member of the Community Foundation of Dunn County, previously serving as grants chair and board president.

Political career
In April 2019, Moses obtained his first public office when he was elected to a three-year term on the Menomonie Area School Board.

In November 2019, incumbent assemblymember Rob Stafsholt announced he would forego re-election, instead attempting a run for Wisconsin State Senate.  In April 2020, Clint Moses announced he would be a candidate in the Republican primary to replace Shafsholt in the Wisconsin State Assembly.

Moses faced two competitors in the Republican primary, Neil Kline and Ryan Sherley, both of New Richmond.  In his campaign announcement, Moses emphasized an interest in affordable access to health care, preserving the environment, and ensuring his region of the state got its fair share of funding for roads and schools.  Although acknowledging the COVID-19 pandemic in his announcement, as the pandemic wore on into the summer, Moses shifted his messaging more towards that issue. Citing concerns about unemployment, the school system, and mental health in the midst of the pandemic, he came out adamantly opposed to additional lockdowns or business restrictions.  Moses won the primary with 38% of the vote and went on to defeat Democrat John Rocco Calabrese in the general election.

Personal life and family
Clint Moses and his wife Nora reside on their family farm in the town of Menomonie, where they raise sheep and cattle.  They have four daughters.

After serving in the Boy Scouts as a child, he has worked in leadership roles in the local Tall Oaks Boy Scouts council.  He has also served on the Colfax Health & Rehabilitation board, and has been a member and past president of the Menomonie Rotary Club.

Electoral history

Menomonie Area School Board (2019)

| colspan="6" style="text-align:center;background-color: #e9e9e9;"| General Election, April 2, 2019

Wisconsin Assembly (2020)

| colspan="6" style="text-align:center;background-color: #e9e9e9;"| Republican Primary, August 11, 2020

| colspan="6" style="text-align:center;background-color: #e9e9e9;"| General Election, November 3, 2020

References

External links
 
 
 Campaign website
 Red Cedar Chiropractic
 Community Foundation of Dunn County
 29th Assembly District map (2011–2021)

Living people
People from Menomonie, Wisconsin
Republican Party members of the Wisconsin State Assembly
21st-century American politicians
University of Wisconsin–Stout alumni
Northwestern Health Sciences University alumni
American chiropractors
1976 births